The 2014 Chicago Marathon was the 37th edition of the Chicago Marathon, held in Chicago, Illinois, on Sunday, October 12. Eliud Kipchoge won the men's race in a time of 2:04:11 hours, with a winning margin of seventeen seconds. Mare Dibaba won the women's division, with a winning margin of twenty seconds. The original winner, Rita Jeptoo, was disqualified after a failed drug test.

Results

Men

Women

Other notable finishers
Lisa Uhl: 18th

Wheelchair men

Wheelchair women

References

Results
Chicago Marathon 2014 Leaderboard. Chicago Marathon. Retrieved on 2014-12-27.
Results. Association of Road Racing Statisticians. Retrieved 2020-04-07.

Chicago Marathon
2010s in Chicago
2014 in Illinois
Chicago Marathon
Chicago
Chicago Marathon
Chicago Marathon